Lampronia novempunctata is a moth of the family Incurvariidae. It is known from Nepal.

The wingspan is about 12 mm.

References

Prodoxidae
Moths of Asia
Moths described in 1982